Raoul de Navery was the pseudonym of Madame Chervet, born Marie-Eugenie Saffray (21 September 1829 in Ploërmel – 17 May 1885 in La Ferté-sous-Jouarre), a French Roman Catholic novelist. She also wrote under the pseudonyms Marie David and M. S. David.

Works 
(incomplete list. Source: Bibliothèque nationale de France

 Le Testament de Jésus, poème évangélique (1850) Texte en ligne
 Aux soldats de l'armée de Lyon (1855)
 Aux soldats de l'armée d'Orient, poésies (1855)
 Pour les inondés (1856) Texte en ligne
 Marguerites, poésies (1856)
 La Crèche et la croix, poésies (1856) Texte en ligne
 Souvenirs du pensionnat (1857) Texte en ligne
 Comédie, drames et proverbes (1858)  Texte en ligne
 Peblo et Simplette (1858)
 Les Prismes (1858) Texte en ligne
 Deux Contes en vers. Les prismes, poésies (1858)
 Viatrice (1860)
 Les Nouvelles de charité (1860)
 L'Ange au bagne (1860)
 Monique (1860)
 Les Récits consolants (1860)
 Le Chemin du paradis (1861) Texte en ligne
 L'Abbé Marcel (1861)
 Avocats et paysans (1861)
 Aglaé (1862)
 La Cendrillon du village (1863)
 Mémoires d'une femme de chambre (1864) Texte en ligne
 Les Religieuses (1864) Texte en ligne
 Bonheur dans le mariage (1864)
 Le Rameur de galère (1865) Texte en ligne
 Jeanne-Marie (1865)
 Le Missionnaire de terre maudite (1866)
 La Femme d'après Saint-Jérôme (1866)
 Martyr d'un secret (1867)
 La Main qui se cache (1867)
 La Confession de la reine (1868)
 Saphir, la Ninivite (1869)
 Le Rameur de galères (1870)
 Le Château des Abymes (1871)
 Les Idoles (1874)
 Zacharie le maître d'école (1874)
 Patira (1875) Texte en ligne (réédition de 1884)
 La Fille du coupeur de paille, suivie d'autres nouvelles (1875)
 Les Drames de la misère (1875) Texte en ligne
 L'Odyssée d'Antoine (1875)
 Le Témoin du meurtre (1875) Texte en ligne
 Les Chevaliers de l'écritoire (1875)
 Le Capitaine aux mains rouges (1876) Texte en ligne
 Madeleine Miller, histoire alsacienne (1876)
 Le Pardon du moine (1876) Texte en ligne
 Les Parias de Paris (1876) 
 Le Trésor de l'abbaye (1876) Texte en ligne
 Le Chemin du paradis (1877)
 La Route de l'abîme (1877)
 Le Cloître rouge (1877) Texte en ligne
 Jean Canada (1877)
 Le Marquis de Pontcallec (1878) Texte en ligne
 L'Aboyeuse (1878) Texte en ligne
 Voyage autour de soi-même (1878) Texte en ligne
 La Conscience (1878)
 Légendes de la vierge de marbre (1878) Texte en ligne
 Les Naufrageurs (1879) Texte en ligne
 La Demoiselle du paveur (1879)
 La Maison du sabbat (1879)
 Madame de Robur (1879) 
 La Péruvienne (1879) Texte en ligne
 Cœurs vaillants. Nouvelles historiques (1879) Texte en ligne
 Le Gouffre (1879)
 L'Accusé (1879) Texte en ligne
 La Fille du roi Dagobert (1879) Texte en ligne
 Les Robinsons de Paris (1879) Texte en ligne
 La Main malheureuse (1880)
 Les Victimes (1880)
 Les Vautours du Bosphore (1880)
 Récits historiques : Gertrude de Wart. Le Duel de la veuve (1880)
 Les Voyages de Camoens (1880) Texte en ligne
 Les Aventures de Martin Tromp (1880)
 La Boîte de plomb (1881)
 Le Martyre d'un père (1881)
 Le Moulin des trépassés. Le Guet de Saint-Malo (1881)
 Le Naufrage de Lianor (1881)
 Le Magistrat (1882)
 Une erreur fatale (1882)
 Lory (1882)
 Les Mystères de Jumièges (1883)
 L'Élixir de longue vie (1883)
 Le Juif Éphraïm (1884)
 La Chambre  (1884)
 Les Mirages d'or (1884)
 Le Serment du corsaire (1884)
 Le Contumax (1885)
 Le Val-Perdu (1885
 Les Îles sauvages (1885)
 L’Évadé (1886)
 Les Enfants du bourgmestre (1888)
 La Conscience (1890) Texte en ligne
 Le Duel de la veuve (1891)
 Le Roman d'un honnête homme (1891)
 Les Dupes (1892)
 Landry (1895)
 La Fille sauvage (1902)
 La Tragique Épopée de Luiz de Camoëns'', poète et gentilhomme portugais aux grandes Indes (1928)

References

1829 births
1885 deaths
People from Morbihan
French women novelists
19th-century French novelists
19th-century French women writers

}